Fountain Square is a city square in Cincinnati, Ohio, United States. Founded in 1871, it was renovated in 1971 and 2005 and currently features many shops, restaurants, hotels, and offices.

History 

An Indian mound stood at the present site of Fountain Square when the first white settlers arrived.

Fountain Square has been the symbolic center of Cincinnati since 1871.  The square, which replaced a butcher's market, was a gift from Henry Probasco in memory of his business partner and brother-in-law, Tyler Davidson.  Probasco traveled to Munich and commissioned a bronze allegorical fountain from Ferdinand von Miller named The Genius of Water. Originally, the square occupied a large island in the middle of Fifth Street with buildings to the north and south, much like nearby Piatt Park.  A 1971 renovation of the square included slightly moving and re-orienting the fountain to the west, and enlarging the plaza by removing the original westbound portion of 5th Street and demolishing buildings to the north.    It is used for lunch-breaks, rallies, and other gatherings.

The Fountain can be seen in the opening credits on WKRP in Cincinnati

In the early 2000s, the square was completely renovated and re-designed by 3cdc and BHDP Architecture (consulted by Cooper, Robertson & Partners and OLIN) to attract more visitors to the city, and to serve as a cultural/recreational hub for the city. In addition to the renovations, many buildings in and around the Fountain Square district are currently being renovated and redesigned. The Fountain itself was completely restored and moved to a more central location in the square.

Tyler Davidson Fountain 

After the death of his brother-in-law and business partner Tyler Davidson, Cincinnati businessman Henry Probasco went to Munich, Germany in search of a suitable memorial to him. Many years before, artist August von Kreling had collaborated with Ferdinand von Miller at the Royal Bronze Foundry of Bavaria to design a fountain. Probasco requested the addition of four figures with animals that would act as drinking fountains, which Miller's sons designed.

Events 

Fountain Square has many events all through the week including speeches, games, movies, concerts,  giveaways, and festivals. The square also has many seasonal events such as Halloween on the square, the ice rink, Oktoberfest (largest outside of Germany) and more.

To celebrate the 40th anniversary of Earth Day 2010, the square featured "EcoSculpt 2010", an exhibit of sustainable art. The exhibit included "Atlas Recycled" by Tom Tsuchiya, a sculpture made of used atlases that doubled as a recycling receptacle for plastic bottles and aluminum cans.

Fountain Square District 
The Fountain Square District is becoming a restaurant and entertainment hub. It contains many offices, hotels, specialty shops and  restaurants.

Office
 Fifth Third Bank Headquarters
 Macy's, Inc.
 U.S. Bancorp
 Great American Insurance Group Headquarters
 Carew Tower — Art Deco hi-rise containing office space and a public observation deck

See also 
Downtown Cincinnati
 Tyler Davidson Fountain

References

External links

Fountain Square (official site)
Cincinnati Center City Development Corporation
Features of Fountain Square
See the original Fountain Square model at the Cincinnati Art Museum

Landmarks in Cincinnati
1871 establishments in Ohio
Squares in Cincinnati
Tourist attractions in Cincinnati
Parks in Cincinnati